Transneft Druzhba (formerly known as Magistralnie Nefteprovodi Druzhba) is a subsidiary of Russia's leading oil transportation and export company Transneft. Transneft Druzhba owns a big network of pipelines within the Russian Federation and neighboring states. It is the main operator of Transneft in management of Druzhba pipeline activities.

The company was established in 1964 once Druzhba pipeline became fully operational.
The pipeline network managed by Transneft Druzhba passes through Ukraine, Belarus, Poland, Czech Republic, Slovakia, Germany, Hungary, Latvia and Lithuania and crosses large rivers such as Volga, Oka, Dnieper, Dniestr, Visla, Danube, highways and railroads and Carpathian mountain range.

There are 46 pump stations, 38 intermediate pumping stations, crude storage reservoirs with capacity for 1.5 million cubic meters of oil. Four largest ones are Lopatino, Klin, Nikolskoe, Unecha. 

The company employs nearly 4,000 people to oversee the operations of the network. Transneft Druzhba consists of three regional operation centers - Kuybishev, Michurinsk, Bryansk and maintains operations in 9 oblasts and 32 regions of Russia.

See also

 Druzhba pipeline
 GDANSK DRUZHBA PIPELINE N.V.

References

External links
 Official site of OAO MN Druzhba

Transneft
Oil companies of Russia
Oil companies of the Soviet Union
Oil pipeline companies
Companies based in Bryansk Oblast